A total of eleven women have been appointed to be senators (judges) of the College of Justice, the Supreme Courts of Scotland established in 1532. The most recent appointment was that of Lady Poole in January 2020, and the most recent retirement was that of Lady Rae later in June, which brought the number of current women judges back to nine.

History 
The first woman appointed as a permanent judge of the Court of Session was Hazel Cosgrove, in 1996. She was followed by Ann Paton in 2000, and in November 2001 by Anne Smith.  Smith's appointment followed a controversy earlier that year when she and Leeona Dorrian QC were passed over in favour of men; but with only three women out of 32 judges, the Scottish courts were still labelled by The Scotsman newspaper as an "old boys' club".

The appointment in early 2005 of Leeona Dorrian raised the number of women judges to four. 
Lynda Clark's appointment in early 2006 briefly raised the number to five, but Cosgrove retired from the bench in March 2006. In May 2008, Scotland's first ever all-female bench was formed by Ladies Paton, Smith and Dorrian, who sat together to hear an appeal.

In November 2008, Valerie Stacey's elevation to the bench brought the number of female judges to five.  No more women were appointed for another 4 years, but between 2012 and 2014 Maggie Scott, Morag Wise, Rita Rae and Sarah Wolffe brought the total to nine out of 32.

Appointments

Serving women judges

References 
 

Women
Lists of judges in Scotland
Senators
Senators
 Senators
Lists of Scottish people by occupation
Lists of female office-holders